The National Film Award – Special Jury Award (Feature Film) is one of the National Film Awards presented annually by the Directorate of Film Festivals, the organisation set up by Ministry of Information and Broadcasting, India. It is one of several awards presented for feature films.

The award was instituted in 1978, at 26th National Film Awards and awarded annually for films produced in the year across the country, in all Indian languages. This award considers all the aspects of film making than individual area.

Winners

See also 
 National Film Award – Special Mention

References

External links 
 Official Page for Directorate of Film Festivals, India
 National Film Awards Archives
 National Film Awards at IMDb

Special Jury Award (feature film)